Alexander Molinari, also known as Alessandro and Alois (5 January 1772, Berlin — 20 January 1831, Dresden) was a German-born portrait painter of Italian ancestry. He worked in several countries, but is best-known for his portraits of the Russian and Polish nobility.

Biography 
From 1787, he studied at the Berlin Academy of Arts, where he excelled in portraits. After graduating, he worked in Rome (1795), Vienna (1796-1797), Glogau and, around 1800, Weimar. While decorating a church in Glogau, he met and befriended the writer, E. T. A. Hoffmann. Later, he would be the inspiration for the artist, "Berthold", in Hoffmann's story, The Jesuit Church in G (1817).

The year 1806 found him in Saint Petersburg, where he was warmly welcomed by Salvatore Tonci, the unofficial leader of an Italian artists' colony in Moscow. By 1807, he was well-established as a portrait painter. In 1810, with Tonci's assistance, he was able to find employment as a drawing teacher for the family of Count , a bibliophile and amateur poet: living on his estate north of Obninsk. 

He soon became a favorite artist of the Russian aristocracy; who admired his knowledge of foreign art, and corresponded with many, including Tsar Alexander I. Occasionally, he collaborated with another well-known portraitist, Orest Kiprensky.

In 1816, he and Kiprensky both left Russia; possibly for political reasons. He went to Warsaw, and lived there until 1822. This was followed by periods in Berlin and Dresden, where he died suddenly, from a stroke, at the age of fifty-nine. 

His works may be seen at the Hermitage Museum, the Tretyakov Gallery, the Russian Museum, and the Pushkin Museum.

Selected portraits

References

Further reading 
 Портретная миниатюра в России (Portrait miniatures in Russia), XIX (from the collection of the State Historical Museum),  Тatiana Selinova (Ed.), Художник РСФСР, 1988 
 "Molinari, Alexander", In: Edward Rastawiecki, Słownik malarzów polskich, tudzież obcych w Polsce osiadłych lub czasowo w niéj przebywających (Dictionary of Polish painters), Vol.2, self-published, 1851 (Online)

External links

1772 births
1831 deaths
German people of Italian descent
German emigrants to Russia
German portrait painters
Russian portrait painters
Artists from Berlin